George L. Perry is an American economist, currently a Senior Fellow emeritus at the Brookings Institution. In 1970, he and Arthur Okun founded the Brookings Panel and its journal, the Brookings Papers on Economic Activity (BPEA). They conceived the Panel as a way to apply rigorous economic research to current economic puzzles, problems and policy issues. After Okun's death in 1980, William Brainard replaced him and Brainard and Perry ran the Panel and edited BPEA until 2007.

In his own research, Perry specializes in labor markets, inflation, fiscal and monetary policy, financial markets, and economic forecasting.

Life and career
George Perry was born in New York in 1934, and grew up in Los Angeles. He enrolled at The Massachusetts Institute of Technology in 1950, and upon graduation served in the U.S. Air Force (1954-1957). After his service, George returned to MIT and received his Ph.D in economics in 1961. Perry served on the staff of the Council of Economic Advisors under President John F. Kennedy, and subsequently was on the economics faculty at the University of Minnesota, reaching the rank of full professor.  In 1969 he returned to Washington to join The Brookings Institution as a Senior Fellow in Economic Studies. In addition to his work at the Brookings Institution, he is a Director Emeritus of various Dreyfus mutual funds and of the State Farm Mutual Automobile Association and State Farm Life Insurance Company.

Brookings Papers on Economic Activity
Soon after they both arrived at Brookings, George Perry and Arthur Okun founded the Brookings Panel and its Journal, the Brookings Papers on Economic Activity.  They would run the Panel meetings and edit BPEA together until Okun's death in 1980.  In the following year Perry enlisted William Brainard to replace Okun, and they ran and edited BPEA for the next 27 years.

When Perry and Brainard turned the Panel over to their chosen successors, Steven Pearlstein of The Washington Post commented:

"Twice a year since 1970, some of the best economists in the world gathered at the Brookings Institution to deliver and critique papers on all the hot topics in macroeconomics. The quality was always high and the disagreements were spirited but respectful, with none of the partisan or ideological rancor that now characterizes so much of economic conversation. But last week's meeting of the panel was special. Nearly 100 alumni, including a certain former Federal Reserve chairman and three Nobel prize winners, gathered to pay tribute to George Perry, a Brookings fixture, and Yale professor Bill Brainard, who have been the guiding hands and spirit of the panel for the past 27 years. It's only a slight exaggeration to say that there are few pieces of received wisdom in macroeconomics today that don't have Perry's and Brainard's fingerprints on them. And it tells you something about the institution they nourished that they will be succeeded by a trio of top-flight economists with deep Washington experience: former Treasury Secretary Larry Summers; Greg Mankiw, former head of President Bush's Council of Economic Advisers; and Doug Elmendorf, who's worked at the Treasury, Fed,Congress and the White House."

Publications
Perry has published many research papers in the Brookings Papers on Economic Activity and in other professional journal including the American Economic Review and the National Tax Journal. In addition to his research papers, Perry has authored and edited numerous books including Unemployment, Money Wage Rates, and Inflation (MIT Press, 1996), Curing Chronic Inflation (Brookings, 1978), and Economic Events, Ideas, and Policies: The 1960s and After (Brookings, 2000).

Personal life
George Perry married the former Dina Axelrad in 1987, and they live in Washington, D.C. He has three children by a previous marriage and three grandchildren. He is learning to play the cello.

References

External links
 Personal webpage at Brookings

American economists
1934 births
Living people
MIT School of Humanities, Arts, and Social Sciences alumni